Brawler is a 2011 American action drama film written and directed by Chris Sivertson. It stars Marc Senter and Nathan Grubbs as the Fontaine Brothers. Senter and Grubbs also produced the film through their company GFY Films. The film had its world premiere at the 2011 Fantasia Film Festival.

Plot
In New Orleans, the Fontaine family name echoes the streets within both the traditional boxing community and the illegal underground fight world. Charlie Fontaine's unflinching loyalty turns out to be both his greatest strength and his Achilles heel, while Bobby Fontaine's ambitions and shenanigans, driven by a dangerous amount of ego, turn destructive. Charlie suffers a permanent injury when called to battle to defend his little brother. While Charlie is forced to hang up his gloves, Bobby's guilt drags him to new lows. When Bobby finds himself drawn to Charlie's wife, an all-out war of brother against brother ensues.

Cast
 Marc Senter as Bobby Fontaine
 Nathan Grubbs as Charlie Fontaine
 Michael Bowen as Rex Baker
 Pell James as Kat
 Bryan Batt as Fat Chucky
 Dane Rhodes as Bruce Atwater
 Garrett Hines as Nickels
 Brian Staph as Walter

Production
Brawler was written by Chris Sivertson and was inspired by a true story Nathan Grubbs heard growing up in New Orleans. Filming took place in New Orleans over 24 days in the summer of 2010.

References

External links
 
The Hollywood Reporter review of Brawler
Variety review

2011 films
American action drama films
2011 action drama films
Films about brothers
Films directed by Chris Sivertson
Mixed martial arts films
Underground fighting films
2010s English-language films
2010s American films